John Houston  (14 May 1889 – 11 December 1964) was an Irish professional footballer who played as a forward in the Football League for Everton and in the Scottish League for Partick Thistle. He was capped by Ireland at international level and represented the Irish League XI.

Personal life 
Houston served in the Royal Irish Rifles before and during the First World War and held the rank of acting colour sergeant. His brother Leslie died of wounds during the war. Houston won the Military Medal in 1917 for conspicuous bravery, when "during an attack on the enemy’s lines all the officers were put out of action and Sergeant Houston took command of his platoon. Houston led the attack in face of a murderous fire, advance 100 yards and succeeded in taking and holding the objective for 36 hours until relief arrived". He was later awarded a bar to his Military Medal. Houston married in 1915 and later worked at the Belfast General Post Office. He served in the Tank Corps during the Second World War.

Career statistics

Honours 
Linfield

 Irish Cup: 1915–16

References

English Football League players
1889 births
Association football outside forwards
Association football forwards
Linfield F.C. players
Everton F.C. players
Partick Thistle F.C. players
Scottish Football League players
Year of death missing
NIFL Premiership players
Irish association footballers (before 1923)
Pre-1950 IFA international footballers
Irish soldiers in the British Army
Irish people of World War I
Irish League representative players
Royal Ulster Rifles soldiers
Recipients of the Military Medal
British Army personnel of World War I
Military personnel from County Antrim

Royal Tank Regiment soldiers
British Army personnel of World War II
1964 deaths